USS O-10 (SS-71) was an O-class submarine of the United States Navy. Her keel was laid down on 27 February 1917 by the Fore River Shipbuilding Company in Quincy, Massachusetts. She was launched on 21 February 1918 sponsored by Mrs. John E. Bailey, and commissioned on 17 August 1918.

Description
The O-class submarines were designed to meet a Navy requirement for coastal defense boats. They displaced  on the surface and  submerged. The O-class submarines had a crew of 29 officers and enlisted men.

For surface running, the boats were powered by two  diesel engines, each driving one propeller shaft. When submerged each propeller was driven by a  electric motor. They could reach  on the surface and  underwater.

The boats were armed with four 18-inch (450 mm)  torpedo tubes in the bow. They carried four reloads, for a total of eight torpedoes. The O-class submarines were also armed with a single 3"/50 caliber deck gun.

Service history
O-10 served during World War I operating out of Philadelphia, Pennsylvania, on coastal patrol against German U-boats until 2 November 1918, when she departed Newport, Rhode Island with other submarines for service in European waters. However, the Armistice with Germany was signed before the ships reached the Azores, and the ships returned to the United States.

In 1919, O-10 joined others of her class at New London, Connecticut, to train submarine crews at the Submarine School there. In 1924, O-10 steamed to Coco Solo, Panama Canal Zone where she was reclassified as a second-line submarine on 25 July 1924. Returning to operations at New London, she reverted to first-line duties on 6 June 1928. She continued at New London until January 1930, when she sailed north to Portsmouth, New Hampshire, returning to New London in February. She continued training duties until February 1931, when she sailed to Philadelphia, decommissioning there on 25 June.

With the approach World War II, there was a recognized need for numerous training submarines. O-10 recommissioned at Philadelphia on 10 March 1941 and went to New London in May. She departed on a trial run to Portsmouth, New Hampshire, on 19 June 1941, the day before  failed to return. O-10 joined in the search for her sister ship but found no trace of her. At 1655 on 22 June, with Secretary of the Navy Frank Knox on board, fired a 21-gun salute for the crew lost on the ill-fated vessel. Returning to New London, O-10 trained crews there until war's end. She then sailed to Portsmouth, New Hampshire and decommissioned there on 10 September 1945. Struck from the Naval Vessel Register on 11 October 1945, she was sold to John J. Duane Company of Quincy on 21 August 1946.

Citations

References

External links
 

United States O-class submarines
World War I submarines of the United States
World War II submarines of the United States
Ships built in Quincy, Massachusetts
1918 ships